The London Film Critics Circle Award for Supporting Actor of the Year in an annual award given by the London Film Critics Circle.

Winners

2010s

2020s

Film awards for supporting actor
A